William Chris Heath (born March 10, 1939), is an American former professional baseball player who played catcher in the Major Leagues in parts of four seasons between  to . He played for the Chicago Cubs, Detroit Tigers, Houston Astros, and Chicago White Sox.

Biography
During his eleven-year career (1960–1970) as a professional, he never played a full season in the Majors, but he was a solid hitter at the minor league level, batting .285 in 760 games.

As a Major Leaguer, Heath appeared in 112 games as a reserve catcher and pinch hitter; his 47 hits included six doubles and one triple.

Heath's wife and daughter were murdered during a home invasion in 1975. His daughter, Courtney (named for catcher Clint Courtney) was kidnapped during the invasion and was the subject of a highly publicized search.

References

External links

1939 births
Living people
Amarillo Sonics players
Arkansas Travelers players
Bakersfield Bears players
Baseball players from California
Chattanooga Lookouts players
Chicago Cubs players
Chicago White Sox players
Des Moines Demons players
Detroit Tigers players
Houston Astros players
Indianapolis Indians players
Major League Baseball catchers
People from Yuba City, California
Spokane Indians players
Syracuse Chiefs players
Tacoma Cubs players
Toledo Mud Hens players
USC Trojans baseball players
Williamsport Grays players